Josh Battle (born 1 September 1998) is a professional Australian rules footballer playing for the St Kilda Football Club in the Australian Football League (AFL). He was drafted by St Kilda with their second selection and thirty-ninth overall in the 2016 national draft.

AFL career 
Before committing to AFL, Battle was a talented cricketer as a junior receiving a cricket scholarship to Haileybury College. He also played in the Victorian Under-17 side. Battle eventually chose AFL after her was selected by the AIS/AFL Academy. On his choice, Battle stated that “in Year 10, when footy was starting to ramp up with bottom-age Stingrays and trying to play cricket, I knew I couldn’t do both, because it was just too hard on the body. I was missing trainings for either one of the two, so it wasn’t fair on other guys that were missing out. I sat down with Dad and he said, ‘Do whatever you find most enjoyable and what you see yourself doing in the future’, and that was footy."

Battle was regarded as one of the best forwards in his draft year, after kicking the most goals of any division at the under-18s championships - 11 goals in four games for Vic Country. Battle also impressed at TAC Cup level, booting 24.13 across eight games. Battle was invited to the AFL Draft Combine where he impressed with his elite endurance by running a 10:07 3km time-trial and reaching 13.7 in the Beep Test. He also won the 3km test at the AFL Academy camp in January that year.

Battle completed year 12 studies in his first season at the Saints. Of juggling both high school and football commitments, Battle stated that "at the time I just wanted to play footy and wasn't too keen on school, but I had good people in my corner who said it would be best to finish school because you don't know how long footy will last. It was difficult because I was only at footy one day a week and the rest of the time I'd train on my own with a couple of coaches, but I was lucky enough to make my debut on the school holidays – that was pretty cool." Battle made his debut, still as a schoolboy, in round 17 against Essendon.

Battle played six games in 2018, and may have appeared in more if it were not for injuries. Battle sustained a fractured eye socket and also battled concussion symptoms in the last three rounds of 2018.  Battle kicked two and three-goal hauls in his second and third games of AFL respectively. Of just his second game, Coach Alan Richrdson described Battle's performance as "a shining light...He kicked a couple of goals, but it was probably more his physicality, his ability to be able to put enormous pressure on when he had the opportunity to tackle.” In 2017 and 2018, Battle spent 90% of his time playing as a key forward.

In 2019, Battle played primarily as a defender, a position he'd never played prior. Coach Richardson saw Battle able to play a James Sicily-type role.  He was a mainstay of the St Kilda side that year, playing 19 of a possible 22 games and averaged 14.7 possessions, six marks and three tackles a game. Battle found himself playing on some of the stars of the competition, including Jack Guntson (who he kept goalless and had 16 touches himself in a round four win) and Jack Darling (who he conceded just one goal and collected a career-high 21 possessions in a three-goal loss).

2020 saw the Saints reach finals for the first time since 2011, and Battle played a big part in a Covid-interrupted season. Battle was unable to break into the side early in the season, with new defender Dougal Howard cementing a place in defence. Battle was called up in round four and played four straight games, including three wins. Battle suffered a concussion following the round seven win over Adelaide. He returned the week later, and played nine consequitve games before a foot injury ruled him out of the Saints' elimination final. Battle recovered and played his first AFL final in the Saints' Semi Final loss to eventual premiers Richmond. He ultimately played 14 of a possible 19 games that year.

2021 saw Battle playing as a utility, seeing action in most parts of the ground. According to Champion Data, he spent 39.5 per cent of his time as a key forward, 34.2 per cent of his time on a wing, 21.2 per cent of his time as a key defender, and 5.1 percent of his time in the ruck. Battle played 16 consequitive matches in 2021 (eight wins, eight losses, two as a medical sub), before a stress fracture in his left ankle forced him to miss the remainder of the season.

Ahead of the 2022 season, Battle was asked to play as a key defender. In the Round Two win again Fremantle, Battle had an influential game with 21 disposals, 13 marks and 13 intercepts possessions.

Statistics 

Statistics are correct to the end of the 2021 season

|-
|- style="background-color: #EAEAEA"
! scope="row" style="text-align:center" | 2017
|style="text-align:center;"|
| 26 || 1 || 1 || 0 || 3 || 2 || 5 || 2 || 0 || 1 || 0 || 3 || 2 || 5 || 2 || 0
|-
|- style="background-color: #EAEAEA"
! scope="row" style="text-align:center" | 2018
|style="text-align:center;"|
| 26 || 6 || 7 || 4 || 33 || 24 || 57 || 17 || 13 || 1.17 || 0.67 || 5.5 || 4 || 9.5 || 2.83 || 2.17
|-
! scope="row" style="text-align:center" | 2019
|style="text-align:center;"|
| 26 || 19 || 3 || 1 || 204 || 76 || 280|| 115 || 52 || 0.16 || 0.05 || 10.74 || 4 || 14.74 || 6.05 || 2.74
|-
|- style="background-color: #EAEAEA"
! scope="row" style="text-align:center" | 2020
|
| 26 || 14 || 12 || 9 || 108 || 34 || 142 || 52 || 26 || 0.86 || 0.64 || 7.71 || 2.43 || 10.14 || 3.71 || 1.86
|-
|- style="background-color: #EAEAEA"
! scope="row" style="text-align:center" | 2021
|style="text-align:center;"|
| 26 || 16 || 3 || 7 || 113 || 73 || 186 || 61 || 46 || 0.19 || 0.44 || 7.06 || 4.56 || 11.63 || 3.81 || 2.88
|- scope="row"  text-align: class="sortbottom"
! colspan=3| Career
! 45
! 25
! 17
! 397
! 156
! 553
! 216
! 105
! 0.56
! 0.38
! 8.82
! 3.47
! 12.29
! 4.8
! 2.23
|}

Notes

Personal life 
At Haileybury College, Battle formed a friendship with Essendon great Matthew Lloyd, who was an assistant coach of the school's senior football team. According to Battle: "I've worked pretty closely with 'Lloydy' since year nine and I still keep in touch with him. We catch up once a month or so. He's a very supportive friend and he gives me great advice."

Battle once dated socialite Mia Fevola, stepdaughter of former Carlton and Brisbane forward Brendan Fevola.

References

External links

1998 births
Living people
People educated at Haileybury (Melbourne)
St Kilda Football Club players
Dandenong Stingrays players
Australian rules footballers from Victoria (Australia)